Sandy Feher (born 23 August 1943 in Budapest, Hungary) is a Hungarian-American former soccer goalkeeper.  In 1970, Feher spent one season played five games with the Kansas City Spurs of the North American Soccer League (NASL).  He also earned three caps with the U.S. national team in 1968.  His first cap came in a 6-3 win over Haiti on October 20, 1968.  His second came seven days later in a 1-0 win over Canada in a qualifier for the 1970 FIFA World Cup.  His last cap came in a 6-2 win over Bermuda in a World Cup qualifier.  However, Gary DeLong came on for Feher in the fourth minute.

References

1943 births
Footballers from Budapest
Hungarian emigrants to the United States
American soccer players
United States men's international soccer players
North American Soccer League (1968–1984) players
Kansas City Spurs players
Association football goalkeepers
Living people